Konetsdvorye is a rural locality (a village) in Ostrovnoye Rural Settlement of Primorsky District, Arkhangelsk Oblast, Russia. The population was 54 as of 2010.

Geography 
Konetsdvorye is located on the Koneshny island, 34 km west of Arkhangelsk (the district's administrative centre) by road. Priluk is the nearest rural locality.

References 

Rural localities in Primorsky District, Arkhangelsk Oblast